David Camilleri (born 21 August 1974 in Ħamrun, Malta) is a professional footballer currently playing for Maltese Premier League side Hamrun Spartans on loan from fellow Maltese Premier League side Valletta. He plays as a midfielder.

Honours

Marsaxlokk
Runner Up
 2004 Maltese Cup

Valletta
Winner
 2007/08 Maltese Premier League

External links
 David Camilleri at MaltaFootball.com
 
 
 

1974 births
Living people
Maltese footballers
Malta international footballers
Ħamrun Spartans F.C. players
Sliema Wanderers F.C. players
Marsaxlokk F.C. players
Hibernians F.C. players
Valletta F.C. players
Tarxien Rainbows F.C. players
Association football midfielders